The Swartz Bay ferry terminal is a  major transportation facility at Swartz Bay in North Saanich, British Columbia. The terminal is part of the BC Ferries system, as well as part of Highway 17.

History
In 1889, former British Columbia Premier Amor De Cosmos, was the first person known to publicly suggest Swartz Bay as a feasible ferry terminal for connections to the Lower Mainland. In 1959, the search for a new ferry terminal north of Victoria involved consideration of the existing San Juan Islands ferry facilities at Sidney. Insufficiently sheltered waters and added travel time, leading to higher fuel costs, precluded Sidney from being selected.

A small private ferry dock operated by the Gulf Islands Ferry Company already existed at Swartz Bay when the choice was made to locate the B.C. Ferry Corporation terminal there. As a result of the decision, a paved extension of the Patricia Bay Highway to reach the terminal was undertaken.

The first scheduled sailing from the terminal, described as a "mudhole" due to the continuing construction, occurred on June 15, 1960. On September 1, 1961, the company that built and used the smaller original dock at Swartz Bay was bought out by B.C. Ferries.

In the SENĆOŦEN language spoken by Indigenous W̱SÁNEĆ people of the area, the bay's name is ŚJEL¸KES.

Accidents and incidents
A fire, caused by a cutting torch, led to $500,000 worth of damage to the terminal in December 1981. It destroyed part of the passenger walkway and a wingwall, prior to being contained by terminal staff, firefighters and the approaching Queen of Nanaimo, which utilized its hoses to help keep the blaze at bay.

Residents have expressed noise concerns over the years, and the matter has been raised in the Legislative Assembly. Concerns have also been expressed ranging from terminal expansion to the shooting of pigeons by ferry staff.

On September 14, 2000, the ferry Spirit of Vancouver Island struck a pleasure craft just off Swartz Bay, killing two individuals.

On May 20, 2011, a truck waiting in line drove up the upper ramp of the terminal's first berth and then through several guard barriers and safety netting at an increased speed. The truck then proceeded to drive off the end of the berth at a high speed and into the water. Later the same day, divers located the truck and deceased driver in the water off the end of the berth, identifying him later that week.

Ferry facilities and connections
Currently, there are five ferry berths at the Swartz Bay ferry terminal. Completed in 2006, the Swartz Bay Berth 2 project involved the replacement of the old marine structures and counter-weighted ramp lift system with a $25 million state-of-the-art floating berth. The terminal provides BC Ferries service to the Tsawwassen ferry terminal on the mainland, as well as all the major southern Gulf Islands. In the mid-1990s, a major terminal renovation was undertaken. The Seaspan Ferries Corporation also has a terminal here.

The terminal includes an administration building, and various kiosks run by local artisans and other vendors mainly in the warmer months. There is also a cafeteria and coffee shop in the main building.

The terminal is served by several Victoria Regional Transit System public transit routes, with Route 70 providing express bus service to and from downtown Victoria in about an hour. Short and long-term pay parking is run by a private operator under contract to BC Ferries. The terminal is located about 10 minutes from Victoria International Airport via Highway 17. The  Lochside Regional Trail also runs south from Swartz Bay to Victoria.

Swartz Bay is the only major southern terminal in the BC Ferries system without a traffic signal at its entrance or exit.

Notes

References

BC Ferries
Transport in the Capital Regional District
Ferry terminals in British Columbia